Harvey Keitel (born May 13, 1939) is an American actor known for his portrayal of morally ambiguous and "tough guy" characters. He rose to prominence during the New Hollywood movement, and has held a long-running association with director Martin Scorsese, starring in six of his films: Who's That Knocking at My Door (1967), Mean Streets (1973), Alice Doesn't Live Here Anymore (1974), Taxi Driver (1976), The Last Temptation of Christ (1988), and The Irishman (2019).

Keitel received the Academy Award for Best Supporting Actor nomination for his portrayal of Mickey Cohen in Bugsy (1991). He won the AACTA Award for Best Actor in a Leading Role for The Piano (1993). Other films include Blue Collar (1978), Thelma & Louise (1991), Reservoir Dogs (1992), Bad Lieutenant (1992), Pulp Fiction (1994), From Dusk till Dawn (1996), Holy Smoke! (1998), Cop Land (1997),  and Youth (2015).

He has acted in the Wes Anderson films Moonrise Kingdom (2012), The Grand Budapest Hotel (2014), and Isle of Dogs (2018). He played FBI Agent Peter Sadusky in both National Treasure (2004), and National Treasure: Book of Secrets (2006) and reprised his role in the Disney+ series National Treasure: Edge of History (2022). From 1995 to 2017, he was a co-president of the Actors Studio, alongside Al Pacino and Ellen Burstyn.

Early life
Keitel was born in New York City, on May 13, 1939, the youngest child of Jewish immigrants. His mother Miriam (née Klein; 1911–1987) was from Romania and his father, Harry Keitel, was from Poland. His parents owned and ran a luncheonette, and his father also worked as a hat maker. He grew up in the Brighton Beach neighborhood of Brooklyn, with his elder sister, Renee, and elder brother, Jerry. He attended Abraham Lincoln High School. He enlisted in the Marines at the age of 17. After his discharge, he worked as a court stenographer for 10–12 years before beginning his acting career.

Career

Keitel studied under both Stella Adler and Lee Strasberg and at the HB Studio, eventually landing roles in some Off-Broadway productions. During this time, Keitel auditioned for filmmaker Martin Scorsese and gained a starring role as "J.R.", in Scorsese's first feature film, Who's That Knocking at My Door (1967). Since then, Scorsese and Keitel have worked together on several projects. Keitel had the starring role in Scorsese's Mean Streets, which also proved to be Robert De Niro's breakthrough film. Keitel re-teamed with Scorsese for Alice Doesn't Live Here Anymore (1974), in which he had a villainous supporting role, and appeared with Robert De Niro again in Scorsese's Taxi Driver (1976), playing the role of Jodie Foster's character's pimp.

In 1977 and 1978, Keitel starred in the directorial debuts of Paul Schrader (Blue Collar, co-starring Richard Pryor and Yaphet Kotto), Ridley Scott (The Duellists, co-starring Keith Carradine), and James Toback (Fingers, in which Keitel played a street hood with aspirations of being a pianist – a role Toback wrote for Robert De Niro to play). In 1979, he was cast as Captain Willard in Francis Ford Coppola's Apocalypse Now (1979). Keitel was involved with the first week of principal photography in the Philippines. Coppola was not happy with Keitel's take on Willard, stating that the actor "found it difficult to play him as a passive onlooker". After viewing the first week's footage, Coppola replaced Keitel with a casting session favorite, Martin Sheen.

Keitel continued to do work on both stage and screen in the 1980s, often in the stereotypical role of a thug. Keitel played a corrupt police officer in the 1983 thriller Copkiller (co-starring musician John Lydon), before taking a supporting role in the romantic drama Falling in Love (1984), starring Robert De Niro and Meryl Streep. Between 1985 and 1988, he was one of the busiest character actors around, appearing in 16 films and telefilms, including Brian De Palma's mobster comedy Wise Guys (1986), starring Danny DeVito and Joe Piscopo, and as Judas in Martin Scorsese's controversial The Last Temptation of Christ (1988).

He co-starred with Jack Nicholson in the Chinatown sequel The Two Jakes (1990), directed by Jack Nicholson. Ridley Scott cast Keitel as the sympathetic policeman in Thelma & Louise in 1991; that same year, Keitel landed a role in Barry Levinson's Bugsy, for which he received an Academy Award nomination for Best Supporting Actor. The following year, Keitel played another mobster in the Whoopi Goldberg-starring comedy Sister Act which was a commercial success at the box office.

Keitel starred in Quentin Tarantino's Reservoir Dogs (which he co-produced) in 1992, where his performance as "Mr. White" took his career to a different level. Since then, Keitel has chosen his roles with care, seeking to change his image and show a broader acting range. One of those roles was the title character in Bad Lieutenant, about a self-loathing, drug-addicted police lieutenant trying to redeem himself. He co-starred in the Jane Campion film The Piano in 1993, and played Winston "The Wolf" Wolfe in Quentin Tarantino's Pulp Fiction, an apparent reprise of his Victor the Cleaner character from 1993's Point of No Return. Keitel starred as a police detective in Spike Lee's Clockers (an adaptation of Richard Price's novel, co-produced by Martin Scorsese). In 1996, Keitel had a major role in Quentin Tarantino and Robert Rodriguez's film From Dusk till Dawn, and in 1997, he starred in the crime drama Cop Land, which also starred Sylvester Stallone, Ray Liotta and Robert De Niro.

His later roles include the fatherly Satan in Little Nicky, a wise Navy man in U-571, diligent FBI Special agent Sadusky in National Treasure and the latter's sequel National Treasure: Book of Secrets. In 1999, Keitel was replaced by Sydney Pollack on the set of Stanley Kubrick's Eyes Wide Shut, due to shooting conflicts, and appeared in Tony Bui's award-winning directorial debut, Three Seasons (which Keitel also executive produced). Keitel also re-teamed with Jane Campion for Holy Smoke! (co-starring Kate Winslet).

In 2001 Keitel played opposite roles: as a U.S. Army denazification investigator in the film Taking Sides and as SS-Oberscharführer Erich Muhsfeldt in the film The Grey Zone. In 2002, at the 24th Moscow International Film Festival, Keitel was honored with the Stanislavsky Award for his outstanding achievement in the career of acting and devotion to the principles of Stanislavsky's school. He also appeared in the Steinlager Pure commercials in New Zealand in 2007. Keitel has appeared nude in several films, including full frontal nudity in Bad Lieutenant and The Piano.

In January 2008, Keitel played Jerry Springer in the New York City premiere of Jerry Springer: The Opera at Carnegie Hall. In 2008, Keitel was cast in the role of Detective Gene Hunt in ABC's short-lived US remake of the successful British time-travel police drama series Life on Mars. In June 2009, he made a cameo appearance in the Jay-Z video for "D.O.A. (Death of Auto-Tune)", a nod to his Brooklyn origins. In 2013, he appeared in a music video for "Pretty Hurts" by Beyoncé. In 2013, he starred in the independent film A Farewell to Fools.

Between 2014 and early 2020, he reprised his role of Winston Wolfe from Pulp Fiction as part of a £40 million television advertising campaign for British insurance company Direct Line. In 2021, he received a Lifetime Achievement Award from the Newport Beach Film Festival. In 2022, Keitel starred in Steven Brand's noir thriller Joe Baby alongside Dichen Lachman, Willa Fitzgerald and Ron Perlman. Keitel has recently collaborated with Wes Anderson acting in minor roles in his films Moonrise Kingdom (2012), The Grand Budapest Hotel (2014), and Isle of Dogs (2018). He reunited with Martin Scorsese after 30 years appearing as mobster Angelo Bruno in his crime film The Irishman (2019) alongside Robert De Niro and Joe Pesci. in He reprised his role FBI Agent Peter Sadusky in the recent Disney+ series National Treasure: Edge of History (2022).

Personal life

Keitel was in a long-term relationship with American actress Lorraine Bracco from 1982 to 1993, but the relationship ended acrimoniously and triggered a prolonged custody battle over their daughter, Stella (born 1985). He married Canadian actress Daphna Kastner in 2001. He had two more children after Stella: a son from his relationship with Lisa Karmazin, and a son from his marriage to Kastner.

Keitel is an honorary citizen of Romania.

Filmography

Film

Television

Theatre

Awards and nominations

References

External links

 
 
 
 

1939 births
20th-century American male actors
21st-century American male actors
Abraham Lincoln High School (Brooklyn) alumni
American Ashkenazi Jews
American male film actors
American people of Polish-Jewish descent
American people of Romanian-Jewish descent
David di Donatello winners
Film producers from New York (state)
Independent Spirit Award for Best Male Lead winners
Jewish American male actors
Lee Strasberg Theatre and Film Institute alumni
Living people
Male actors from New York City
Method actors
People from Brighton Beach
People from Fire Island, New York
United States Marines
Jewish American military personnel
21st-century American Jews